William Hughes Curran (1893-1940) was an American film director. He directed several Western films.

He was an assistant director to Lambert Hillyer at William S. Hart Productions before heading the production unit for Famous Players-Lasky executives' spinoff Di Lorenzo, Inc.

He directed an early nickelodeon adaptation of William Shakespeare's Taming of the Shrew.

According to IMDb he wrote The Freshie and Broadway Buckaroo and appeared as Pablo in Blaze Away.

FilmographyThe Trail of Hate (1922)Blaze Away (1922)The Freshie (1922), Curran wrote the story and directed the filmDangerous Hour (1923)Prepared to Die (1923)The Knock on the Door (1923)Westbound (1924)The Taming of the Shrewd (1925)The Merchant of Weenies (1925)Battling Romeo (1925)Scarlet Youth (1928)Trial Marriage (1928)Unguarded Girls'' (1929)

References

External links

Film directors from New York (state)
1893 births
1940 deaths